Laurencia is a genus of red algae that grow in temperate and tropical shore areas, in littoral to sublittoral habitats, at depths up to .

Description

Laurencia species have a thallus that is erect or decumbent with distichous, whorled or radial branch arrangement.

Taxonomy and Nomenclature 
The genus name of Laurencia is in honour of Louis Jean de La Laurencie (1768-1829), who was a French Naval officer, Director of the University of Limoges and also a friend of the author, Jean Vincent Félix Lamouroux.

The genus was circumscribed by Jean Vincent Félix Lamouroux in Ann. Mus. Natl. Hist. Nat. vol.20 on page 130 in 1813.
It included an initial description of eight species which then subsequently underwent taxonomic revisions. The genus belongs to order Ceramiales reported to have 137 species, with a rich body of knowledge spanning for more than 50 years of research.

Laurencia belongs to the family Rhodomelaceae which is considered to be one of the largest marine red algae family, estimated to have 125 genera and 700 species all over the world. In Laurenciae, a tribe consisting of eight genera, have a taxonomic group called "Laurencia complex" or Laurencia sensu lato which includes six of eight genera, Chondrophycus, Laurencia, Laurenciella, Osmundea, Palisada, and Yuzurua.

Morphology 
Laurencia is a small to medium sized red algae which may appear to be iridescent with thalli reaching up to 40 cm. Thalli can be branching, which can either be bilateral or spread in all directions. Its appendages can be rhizoidal or discoidal in appearance on stoloniferous holdfasts. Branch shape appears to be flat or cylindrical in morphology. Branchlets may be slightly rigid with a shape that may be blunt, truncate or claviform.

Laurencia has shown high diversity as a genus, with species having distinct features that can easily be determined within the Laurencia complex. Molecular studies using rbcL (RuBisCO, Ribulose-1,5-Bisphosphate Carboxylase Oxygenase, Large chain) have uncovered evidences which divided the Laurencia complex, identiying the genus Laurenciella, which shares similar morphology with Laurencia but has a different rbcL sequence.

Distribution 
Laurencia can be found all over the world, in particular in tropical and subtropical regions with warmer waters. Its habitats range from tide pools, reef flats, mud flats, and a variety of hard substrates (e.g. rocks, corals), within intertidal and subtidal zones up to 65 m.  It is also described as "turf-forming" wherein it can cover a majority of hard substrate in some areas.

In Myanmar, it can be found growing together with some species of Cladophora, Chaetomorpha, Dictyota, Gelidium, Ceramium, Caloglossa, Catenella, Polysiphonia, Acanthophora, and Bostrychia.

Ecology 
Laurencia has numerous ecological roles, serving as refuge for different marine organisms in areas where they grow abundantly, forming forests. They are also hosts of various mircoorganisms and parasitic algae, known as Janczewskia. As producers, they are also fed on by some grazers such as crabs, queen conch, and sea hares despite its chemical deterrent.

The growth of Laurencia is significantly affected by changes in nutrient availability and temperature. The effects of pollution in Laurencia are somewhat inconsistent showing its adaptability in Indian Ocean but markedly showed a decrease in biomass in polluted areas in the Mediterranean. Space within the environment is also a necessity for Laurencia survival. In field trials, Laurencia tends to inhibit coral larvae dispersal resulting to higher mortality when the algae is present.

Life History 
Laurencia grows throughout the year, with spermatangial individuals appearing from early August to late September while cystocarpic ones appear from mid-August to late October. From July to October, mature tetrasporangial plants appear. Gametophytic individuals are dioecious in nature, typically developed on the branchlets, but can be present in the main branch as well.

Male gametophytes contain spermatangia on trichoblast while female gametophytes contain carpogonia, representing the haploid phase. Two diploid phases occur in Laurencia: one with carpogonia and carpospore and the other, with tetrasporangia. Therefore, Laurencia undergoes three phases in its life cycle: one haploid phase and two diploid phases, consistent to the Polysiphonia triphasic life history.

Cultivation and Exploitation 
A growing interest in the cultivation of Laurencia brongniartii has emerged due to its potential to be a newfound source for antibiotics. The common method is indoor tank culture, utilizing an excised apical tip from a thalli sample. Initial trials have confirmed its viability for culture providing opportunities for personnel with little to no experience in algae cultivation. The cost of production is relatively low, with maintenance costs at its core. Small-scale operations may be profitable in maximizing algae production, however more studies are needed to evaluate these conditions.

Chemical Composition 
Laurencia species are known to have several natural products exhibiting numerous biological activities such as chemical defense against grazers, anti-fouling chemical affecting Perna perna attachment, and anti-fouling activities. In addition, Laurencia is known to be an abundant source of halogenated metabolites, including a variety of terpenes (e.g. sesquiterpenes, diterpenes, triterpenes, and C15 acetogenins).

In Vietnam, L. snackeyi may be a potential species to evaluate new chemical races, similar to L. nipponica seeing how these may indicate similarities in morphology but differences in chemical content subject to geographical distribution.

Utilization and Management 
A total of 1047 secondary metabolites have been extracted from Laurencia and Aplysia species since 2015. The diverse chemical composition of Laurencia has been subject to numerous research mainly attributed to both environmental and genetic factors. For years, humans have utilized Laurencia as food, medicinal products, fertilizers, and from recent research, an abundant source of pharmacological significance. The commercialization of the species may require further research in order to optimize culture conditions and eventually, harvest greater yield and develop a more systematic cultivation system.

Species 
AlgaeBase, a database with detailed information on species of Laurencia, includes 137 taxonomically accepted species , and differentiates these from a further ~375 entries of uncertain taxonomic status; it further delineates homotypic or heterotypic synonyms.

Commonly observed species of Laurencia include the shallow subtidal Laurencia nidifica (Hawaii), Laurencia pacifica (California), and Laurencia thyrsifera (New Zealand). Species seen in the British Isles include Laurencia hybrida, Laurencia obtusa, Laurencia osmunda, Laurencia pinnatifida, Laurencia pyramidalis, and Laurencia truncata.

The World Register of Marine Species lists the following species as accepted:

Laurencia aguilar-rosasorum J.N.Norris, 2014
Laurencia aldingensis Saito & Womersley, 1974
Laurencia alsidioides P.L.Crouan & H.M.Crouan, 1865 (species inquirenda)
Laurencia arbuscula Sonder, 1845
Laurencia batracopus (Bory de Saint-Vincent) Greville, 1830
Laurencia boryi De Notaris, 1842
Laurencia botrychioides Harvey, 1855
Laurencia botryocarpa Shperk, 1869
Laurencia botryoides (C.Agardh) Gaillon, 1828
Laurencia brachyclados Pilger, 1920
Laurencia brasiliana G.Martens, 1871
Laurencia brongniartii J.Agardh, 1841
Laurencia caduciramulosa Masuda & Kawaguchi, 1997
Laurencia californica (Kützing) Kützing, 1865
Laurencia calliclada Masuda, 1997
Laurencia calliptera Kützing, 1865
Laurencia canaliculata J.Agardh
Laurencia caraibica P.C.Silva, 1972
Laurencia caspica A.D.Zinova & Zaberzhinskaya, 1967
Laurencia catarinensis Cordeiro-Marino & Fujii, 1985
Laurencia cervicornis Harvey, 1853
Laurencia chauvinii Bory de Saint-Vincent
Laurencia chilensis De Toni, Forti & M.A.Howe, 1920
Laurencia chinensis C.K.Tseng, 1943
Laurencia chondrioides Børgesen, 1918
Laurencia cladonioides Kützing
Laurencia clarionensis Setchell & Gardner, 1937
Laurencia clavata Sonder, 1853
Laurencia clavifera Suhr
Laurencia claviformis Børgesen, 1924
Laurencia coelenterata D.L.Ballantine & Aponte, 1995
Laurencia complanata (Suhr) Kützing, 1849
Laurencia composita Yamada, 1931
Laurencia condaoensis Pham Hoàng Hô
Laurencia congesta Taylor, 1945
Laurencia coronopus J.Agardh, 1852
Laurencia corymbifera Kützing
Laurencia corymbosa J.Agardh, 1852
Laurencia crassifrons P.L.Crouan & H.M.Crouan
Laurencia crustiformans K.J.McDermid, 1989
Laurencia cryptoclada Kützing, 1866
Laurencia cyanosperma (Delile) Gaillon, 1828
Laurencia cyanosperma Delile ex J.V.Lamouroux, 1813
Laurencia cylindrica (Kützing) Kützing
Laurencia cymosa Kützing, 1865
Laurencia decidua E.Y.Dawson, 1954
Laurencia decumbens Kützing, 1863
Laurencia dendroidea J.Agardh, 1852
Laurencia densissima Setchell & N.L.Gardner, 1937
Laurencia depauperata Zanardini
Laurencia distichophylla J.Agardh, 1852
Laurencia elata (C.Agardh) J.D.Hooker & Harvey, 1847
Laurencia epiphylla F.Boisset & J.C.Lino, 1998
Laurencia ericoides Kützing
Laurencia fasciculata (Turner) Greville, 1830
Laurencia fastigiata Montagne, 1846
Laurencia fenicalli J.N.Norris, 2014
Laurencia filiformis (C.Agardh) Montagne, 1845
Laurencia filiformis f. decussata A.B.Cribb
Laurencia flagelliformis J.Agardh
Laurencia flexuosa Kützing, 1849
Laurencia foldatsii N.Rodríguez Rios, 1981
Laurencia forsteri (Mertens ex Turner) Greville, 1830
Laurencia galtsoffii M.A.Howe, 1934
Laurencia gardneri Hollenberg, 1943
Laurencia glomerata (Kützing) Kützing, 1849
Laurencia gracilis J.D.Hooker & Harvey, 1849
Laurencia griseaviolacea M.J.Wynne, 2017
Laurencia hamata Yamada, 1932
Laurencia hancockii E.Y.Dawson, 1944
Laurencia heteroclada Harvey, 1855
Laurencia hongkongensis C.K.Tseng, C.F.Chang, E.Z.Xia & B.M.Xia, 1980
Laurencia humilis Setchell & N.L.Gardner, 1930
Laurencia indica Hauck, 1888
Laurencia indica var. nidifica Hauck, 1888
Laurencia intercalaris K.W.Nam, 1994
Laurencia intricata J.V.Lamouroux, 1813
Laurencia iriei J.N.Norris
Laurencia irieii J.N.Norris
Laurencia japonensis T.Abe & Masuda, 1998
Laurencia johnstonii Setchell & Gardner, 1924
Laurencia lageniformis Masuda & Suzuki, 1997
Laurencia lajolla E.Y.Dawson, 1958
Laurencia laurahuertana Mateo-Cid, Mendoza-González, Senties & Diaz-Larrea, 2014
Laurencia laxa (R.Brown ex Turner) Gaillon, 1828
Laurencia ligulata E.Y.Dawson, 1963
Laurencia lutea J.V.Lamouroux
Laurencia mariannensis Yamada, 1931
Laurencia masonii Setchell & N.L.Gardner, 1930
Laurencia maxineae E.Y.Dawson, 1944
Laurencia mcdermidiae I.A.Abbott, 1996
Laurencia mediocris Setchell & N.L.Gardner, 1937
Laurencia melanothrix (Bory) Kützing
Laurencia mexicana Kützing
Laurencia microcladia Kützing, 1865
Laurencia minuscula Schnetter, 1976
Laurencia minuta H.Vandermeulen, Garbary & Guiry, 1990
Laurencia minuta subsp. scammaccae G.Furnari & Cormaci, 1990
Laurencia moretonensis A.B.Cribb, 1958
Laurencia multiflora Kützing, 1865
Laurencia nana (C.Agardh) Greville, 1830
Laurencia nangii Masuda, 1997
Laurencia nanhaiensis L.Ding, B.Huang, B.M.Xia & C.K.Tseng, 2007
Laurencia natalensis Kylin, 1938
Laurencia nidifica J.Agardh, 1852
Laurencia nidifica var. tenuior Sonder
Laurencia nipponica Yamada, 1931
Laurencia nuda Suhr, 1840
Laurencia obtusa (Huds.) J.V.Lamouroux, 1813 - type species
Laurencia obtusa var. compacta A.B.Cribb, 1958
Laurencia obtusa var. densa Yamada
Laurencia obtusa var. divaricata Yamada, 1931
Laurencia obtusa var. gracilis (C.Agardh) Zanardini, 1847
Laurencia obtusa f. laxa 
Laurencia obtusa var. mollissima A.B.Cribb, 1958
Laurencia obtusa var. pulvinata Feldmann
Laurencia obtusa var. pyramidalis Harvey, 1849
Laurencia obtusa f. pyramidata (J.Agardh) Van Heurck, 1908
Laurencia obtusa var. pyramidica J.Agardh
Laurencia obtusa var. racemosa Kützing, 1865
Laurencia obtusa var. rigidula Grunow, 1874
Laurencia obtusiuscula Setchell & Gardner, 1924
Laurencia obtusiuscula var. corymbifera Setchell & Gardner, 1924
Laurencia obtusiuscula var. laxa Setchell & Gardner, 1924
Laurencia okamurae Yamada, 1931
Laurencia oliveirana Yoneshigue, 1985
Laurencia omaezakiana Masuda, 1997
Laurencia oophora Kützing, 1865
Laurencia oppositoclada Taylor
Laurencia oppositocladia Taylor, 1945
Laurencia ovalis (Huds.) Frauenfeld
Laurencia pacifica Kylin, 1941
Laurencia paitensis W.R.Taylor, 1947
Laurencia pannosa Zanardini, 1872
Laurencia parvula Børgesen, 1937
Laurencia patentissima ützing, 1865
Laurencia peninsularis Stegenga, J.J.Bolton & R.J.Anderson, 1987
Laurencia peninsularis Taylor, 1945
Laurencia pinnata Yamada, 1931
Laurencia pinnatifida (S.G.Gmel.) Lamouroux
Laurencia pistillaris J.V.Lamouroux, 1822
Laurencia platyclada Børgesen, 1934
Laurencia ptychodes A.B.Cribb, 1983
Laurencia pumila (Grunow) Papenfuss, 1943
Laurencia pyramidalis Bory de Saint-Vincent ex Kützing, 1849
Laurencia pyramidata Bory de Saint-Vincent, 1852
Laurencia pyrifera (Kützing) Kützing
Laurencia radicans (Kützing) Kützing, 1849
Laurencia richardsii E.Y.Dawson, 1954
Laurencia rigida J.Agardh, 1876
Laurencia saitoi L.P.Perestenko, 1980
Laurencia scrippsensis E.Y.Dawson, 1944
Laurencia setacea Kützing
Laurencia shepherdii Saito & Womersley, 1974
Laurencia silvae J.F.Zhang & B.M.Xia, 1983
Laurencia similis K.W.Nam & Y.Saito, 1991
Laurencia singaporensis Zanardini ex De Toni & Levi, 1888
Laurencia snackeyi (Weber-van Bosse) M.Masuda, 1997
Laurencia snyderae E.Y.Dawson, 1945
Laurencia snyderae var. guadalupensis E.Y.Dawson, 1963
Laurencia spicifera Sonder, 1881
Laurencia spinulifera Kützing, 1865
Laurencia subcolumnaris Børgesen, 1954
Laurencia subcorymbosa E.Y.Dawson, 1963
Laurencia subdisticha E.Y.Dawson, Neushul & Wildman, 1960
Laurencia subopposita (J.Agardh) Setchell, 1914
Laurencia subsimplex C.K.Tseng, 1943
Laurencia succulenta K.W.Nam, 2006
Laurencia tasmanica J.D.Hooker & Harvey, 1849
Laurencia tenera C.K.Tseng, 1943
Laurencia tenuissima 
Laurencia tenuissima var. corymbulosa Caldesi
Laurencia thrysoidea Montagne
Laurencia thyrsifera J.Agardh, 1876
Laurencia thyrsoides (Turner) Gaillon, 1828
Laurencia translucida Fujii & Cordeiro-Marina, 1996
Laurencia tristicha C.K.Tseng, C.F.Chang, E.Z.Xia & B.M.Xia
Laurencia tropica Yamada, 1931
Laurencia tuberculosa J.Agardh
Laurencia turbinata Setchell & N.L.Gardner, 1937
Laurencia uncinata Zanardini, 1847
Laurencia urceolata J.Agardh
Laurencia usneoides (C.Agardh) Kützing, 1849
Laurencia uvifera (Forsskål) Børgesen, 1932
Laurencia venusta Yamada, 1931
Laurencia verruculosa Børgesen, 1954
Laurencia versicolor (Vahl) J.V.Lamouroux
Laurencia vieillardii Kützing, 1865
Laurencia viridis Gil-Rodríguez & Haroun, 1992
Laurencia voragina W.R.Taylor, 1945
Laurencia wrightii (Turner) Kützing

Uses
Laurencia nidifica is used as a condiment in Hawaii due to its peppery taste.

References

Further reading
 
 

Rhodomelaceae
Red algae genera